Frank William Simpson (1871 – December 8, 1929) was an American football player and coach.  He served as the head football coach at the University of Oregon from 1898 to 1899 and at the University of California, Berkeley in 1901, compiling a career college football record of 15–3–2. From 1898 to 1899, he guided the Oregon Webfoots to a 6–3–1 record.  At California in 1901, he coached the Golden Bears to a 9–0–1 record.

Simpson was killed instantly when his car crashed into a tree when he and his wife were returning from a duck hunt hear Alvarado, California in December 1929. His wife later died in the hospital.

Head coaching record

References

 McCann, Michael C. (1995). Oregon Ducks Football: 100 Years of Glory. Eugene, OR: McCann Communications Corp.

External links
 

1871 births
1929 deaths
19th-century players of American football
American football tackles
California Golden Bears football coaches
California Golden Bears football players
Oregon Ducks football coaches
People from Contra Costa County, California
Players of American football from California
Road incident deaths in California
Sportspeople from the San Francisco Bay Area